The FFV 018 is a Swedish off-route anti-tank mine. It uses a large Misznay Schardin effect warhead, that generates a fast moving slug capable of penetrating the side armour of a tank. The mine is mounted on a squat tripod, and houses a built- in infra-red sensor package, which detects the target and triggers the mine when the target is in the optimal position.

Specifications
 Weight: 15 kg (approx)

See also
 FFV 016 mine

References
 

Anti-tank mines
Land mines of Sweden